Charles Edward "Buster" Brown (August 31, 1881 – February 9, 1914), was a Major League baseball pitcher from -. He played for the Philadelphia Phillies, St. Louis Cardinals, and Boston Braves.

External links

1881 births
1914 deaths
Major League Baseball pitchers
Baseball players from Iowa
St. Louis Cardinals players
Philadelphia Phillies players
Boston Braves players
Omaha Rangers players
Iowa State Cyclones baseball players